National Non-Fiction Day (NNFD) is annual celebration of children's non-fiction in the UK.

It was initiated by The Federation of Children's Book Groups in partnership with Scholastic Children’s Books and is celebrated across the UK each year on the first Thursday in November (at approximately the same time as the announcement of the winners of the School Library Association Information Book Award).

The day is used by libraries, schools, literacy organisations, book reviewers and parents to highlight the best information and narrative non-fiction books for children, and to show how it’s not just fiction that can be read and enjoyed for pleasure. Each year there is a different theme to the day.

References

External links 
 National Non-Fiction Day website
 Children's non-fiction authors

Non-fiction
November observances
Thursday observances
Reading (process)